Henri Mauperché (c.1602, Paris - 26 December 1686, Paris) was a French landscape painter and engraver. His name is also given as Henri Maupercher and Henri Montpercher. Most of his landscapes are capriccios.

Biography
He was a student of Daniel Rabel. He returned to Paris in 1639, where he was commissioned to paint decorations in the guard room and antechamber of the Palais-Cardinal; the residence of Cardinal Richelieu.

In 1645, he married Magdeleine Garnot. From 1646 to 1647, he worked on decorating the "Cabinet de l'Amour" at the Hôtel Lambert, along with the landscape painters Pierre Patel, Jan Asselyn and Herman van Swanevelt.

In 1648, he became a member of the Académie royale de peinture et de sculpture and was named a Professor in 1655, which was an unusual honor for a landscape painter. Together with Laurent de La Hyre, he helped to popularize the classical landscape style of Claude Lorrain. Having become famous for his decorations, he undertook to paint the apartments of Queen Anne of Austria at Fontainebleau. As with the Hôtel Lambert, the greater part of those works have disappeared.

His wife died in 1671. By 1686, he was too ill to attend sessions of the Académie, and was excused. He died at the end of that year.

Sources
 Bernard Biard; "Henri Mauperché, paysagiste au long cours", in, L’Objet d’Art, #316, September 1997, pgs.31-41

External links

1600s births
1686 deaths
French landscape painters
17th-century French painters